(Main list of acronyms)


 k – (s) Kilo-
 K – (s) Kelvin – Potassium (Latin Kalium) – Tanker (aircraft designation code)

K0–9 
 K9 – (p) Canine Police Unit

KA 
 ka – (s) Georgian language (ISO 639-1 code)
 kA – (s) Kiloampere
 Ka – (s) Kamov Design Bureau
 KA – (i) Knowledge Acquisition – (s) Karnataka (Indian state code)
 KAF – (i/a) Kandahar Air Field
 KAGB (German law) – (i) Kapitalanlagegesetzbuch or the German Capital Investment Code
 kal – (s) Kalaallisut language (ISO 639-2 code)
 kan – (s) Kannada language (ISO 639-2 code)
 KANUKOKA – (a) Kalaallit Nunaanni Kommunit Kattuffiannit (Kalaallisut, "Greenlandic Communities Association")
 KARNAC – (a) Knowledge Aided Retrieval in Activity Context
 KARR – (a) Knight Automated Roving Robot (Knight Rider character)
 kas – (s) Kashmiri language (ISO 639-2 code)
 kat – (s) Georgian language (ISO 639-2 code)
 KATUSA – (a) Korean Augmentation To United States Army
 kau – (s) Kanuri language (ISO 639-2 code)
 kaz – (s) Kazakh language (ISO 639-2 code)
 KAZ – (s) Kazakhstan (ISO 3166 trigram)

KB 
 KBE – (i) Knight Commander of the Order of the British Empire
 KBO – (i) Kuiper Belt Object
 KBVB – (i) Koninklijke Belgische Voetbalbond (Dutch for Royal Belgian Football Association)

KC 
 kC – (s) Kilocoulomb
 KCK
 (i) Kansas City, Kansas
 Koma Civakên Kurdistan (Kurdish, "Union of Communities in Kurdistan")
 KCL – (i) King's College London
 KCMO – (p) Kansas City, Missouri (pronounced "K-C-Moe")
 KCS – (s) Kansas City Southern Railway (AAR reporting mark)

KD 
 KD – (i) Kawasaki Disease – Kraft Dinner

KE 
 KE
  (s) Kenya (FIPS 10-4 country code; ISO 3166 digram)
 (i) Kinetic Energy
 Knowledge Engineering
 KEDO – (a) Korean Peninsula Energy Development Organization
 KEN – (s) Kenya (ISO 3166 trigram)
 KERA – (a) Kentucky Education Reform Act (of 1990)
 kerma – (p) Kinetic Energy Released in MAterial / in MAtter / per unit MAss
 KES
 (s) Kenyan shilling (ISO 4217 currency code)
 (i) Killer Elite Squad (Japanese professional wrestling stable)
 KESR – (i) Kent and East Sussex Railway.
 KET
 (i) Kentucky Educational Television
 (a) Key English Test

KF 
 kF – (s) Kilofarad
 KFC – (i) Kentucky Fried Chicken
 KFOR – (p) UN Kosovo Force
 KFUPM – King Fahd University of Petroleum & Minerals

KG 
 kg – (s) Kilogram – Kongo language (ISO 639-1 code)
 KG – (s) Kyrgyzstan (FIPS 10-4 country code; ISO 3166 digram)
 KGB – (i) Komitet Gosudarstvennoy Bezopasnosti (Russian "Committee for State Security") (1954–1991)
 KGO – Knight of the Guelphic Order of Hanover
 KGS – (s) Kyrgyz som (ISO 4217 currency code)
 KGZ – (s) Kyrgyzstan (ISO 3166 trigram)

KH 
 kH – (s) Kilohenry
 KH – (s) Cambodia (ISO 3166 digram)
 khm – (s) Khmer language (ISO 639-2 code)
 KHL – (i) Kontinental Hockey League
 KHM – (s) Cambodia (ISO 3166 trigram)
 KHR – (s) Cambodian riel (ISO 4217 currency code)
 KHz – (s) Kilohertz

KI 
 ki – (s) Gikuyu language (ISO 639-1 code)
 Ki – (s) Kibi
 KI – (s) Kiribati (ISO 3166 digram)
 KIA – (i) Killed In Action
 KIDS – (a) Knowledge-based Integrated Design System
 kik – (s) Gikuyu language (ISO 639-2 code), common typo for LOL
 kin – (s) Kinyarwanda language (ISO 639-2 code)
 kir – (s) Kyrgyz language (ISO 639-2 code)
 KIR – (s) Kiribati (ISO 3166 trigram)
 KISS – (a) Keep It Simple, Stupid / Keep It Short and Simple – Korean Intelligence Support System
 KITECH – (p) Korean Institute of Industrial Technology
 KITT – (a) Knight Industries Two Thousand - Knight Industries Three Thousand
 KIT – Keep In Touch

KJ 
 kj – (s) Kuanyama language (ISO 639-1 code)
 kJ – (s) Kilojoule

KK 
 kk – (s) Kazakh language (ISO 639-1 code)
 kK – (s) Kilokelvin
 KK
 (i) Kabushiki kaisha (Japanese for "Stock Company", found in the legal names of countless Japanese corporations)
 Košarkarski klub (Slovenian), Košarkaški Klub (Croatian and Serbian in Latin script), Кошаркашки клуб (Serbian Cyrillic), Krepšinio Klubas (Lithuanian); all mean "Basketball Club", as in KK Olimpija, KK Cibona, KK Partizan, and KK Atletas
 KKK – (i) Ku Klux Klan

KL 
 kl – (s) Kalaallisut language (ISO 639-1 code)
 kL – (s) Kilolitre
 KL – (i) Kuala Lumpur – (s) Kerala (Indian state code)
 KLENOT – (p) KLEť Observatory Near Earth and Other unusual objects observations Team and Telescope
 KLM – (i) Koninklijke Luchtvaart Maatschappij (Dutch "Royal Dutch Airlines")
 KLOC – (a) Kilo Lines Of Code
 KLS
 (i) Kleine–Levin syndrome
 Košarkaška liga Srbije (Latin) or Кошаркашка лига Србије (Cyrillic) (Serbian, "Basketball League of Serbia")
 Kuala Lumpur Sentral

KM 
 km – (s) Khmer language (ISO 639-1 code) – Kilometre
 KM – (s) Comoros – (i) Knowledge Management
 KMF – (s) Comoro franc (ISO 4217 currency code)
 KMFDM – (i) Kein mitleid für die mehrheit (German "No pity for the majority" music band)
 KMR – (i) Kwajalein Missile Range

KN 
 kn – (s) Kannada language (ISO 639-1 code)
 kN – (s) Kilonewton
 KN – (s) Democratic People's Republic of Korea (FIPS 10-4 country code) – Saint Kitts and Nevis (ISO 3166 digram)
 KNA – (s) Saint Kitts and Nevis (ISO 3166 trigram)
 KNVB – (i) Koninklijke Nederlandse Voetbal Bond (Dutch for Royal Dutch Football Association)

KO 
 ko – (s) Korean language (ISO 639-1 code)
 KO – (i) Knocked Out
 kom – (s) Komi language (ISO 639-2 code)
 kon – (s) Kongo language (ISO 639-2 code)
 kor – (s) Korean language (ISO 639-2 code)
 KOR – (s) Republic of Korea (ISO 3166 trigram)

KP 
 KP – (i) Kim Possible
 KPMG – (i) Klynveld, Peat, Marwick, Goerdeler
 KPNO – (i) Kitt Peak National Observatory
 KPV – (i) Krupnokaliberniy Pulemet Vladimorova (Russian КПВТ Крупнокалиберный Пулемет Владимирова, "Large-Calibre Machinegun Vladimirov")
 KPVT – (i) Krupnokaliberniy Pulemet Vladimorova Tankoviy (Russian КПВТ Крупнокалиберный Пулемет Владимирова Танковый, "Large-Calibre Machinegun Vladimirov Tank")
 KPW – (s) North Korean won (ISO 4217 currency code)
 K–Pg – (i) Cretaceous–Paleogene Boundary
 K/Pg – (i) Cretaceous/Paleogene Boundary

KQ 
 KQ – (s) Kenya Airways (IATA airline designator) – Kingman Reef (FIPS 10-4 territory code)

KR 
 kr – (s) Kanuri language (ISO 639-1 code)
 Kr – (s) Krypton
 KR – (s) Kiribati (FIPS 10-4 country code) – Republic of Korea (ISO 3166 digram)
 KRW – (s) South Korean won (ISO 4217 currency code)

KS 
 ks
 (s) Kashmiri language (ISO 639-1 code)
 Kilosecond
 kS – (s) Kilosiemens
 KS
 (s) Kansas (postal symbol)
 Republic of Korea (FIPS 10-4 country code)
 KSC – (i) Kennedy Space Center
 KSI – (i) Killed or Seriously Injured
 KSM
 (i) Korean Service Medal
 Khalid Sheikh Mohammed
 KSU – (a) Kansas State University

KT 
 kT – (s) Kilotesla
 KT – (s) Christmas Island (FIPS 10-4 territory code) – (i) Knight of the Order of the Thistle – Knights Templar
 K–T – (i) Cretaceous–Tertiary Boundary
 K/T – (i) Cretaceous/Tertiary Boundary
 KTS – (i) Knight of the Tower and Sword (of Portugal)

KU 
 ku – (s) Kurdish language (ISO 639-1 code)
 KU – (s) Kuwait (FIPS 10-4 country code)
 kua – (s) Kuanyama language (ISO 639-2 code)
 KUL – (i) Katholieke Universiteit Leuven (Flemish, Catholic University of Leuven)
 kur – (s) Kurdish language (ISO 639-2 code)
 KUW – (s) Kuwait (UNDP country code, IOC and FIFA trigram, but not ISO 3166)

KV 
 kv – (s) Komi language (ISO 639-1 code)
 kV – (s) Kilovolt
 KV - (s) Kosovo
 KV – (s) Kavminvodyavia (IATA airline designator) –  (i) Kendriya Vidhyalaya (Indian school) – Kliment Voroshilov (tanks) – Köchel-Verzeichnis (Mozart catalogue) – Valley of the Kings (originally "Kings' Valley")
 KVM – (i) Keyboard, Video, Mouse switch
 KVT – (i) Killer-Victim Table (military simulations)

KW 
 kw – (s) Cornish language (ISO 639-1 code)
 kW – (s) Kilowatt
 KW – (s) Kuwait (ISO 3166 digram)
 KWB – Kids' WB!
 KWD – (s) Kuwaiti dinar (ISO 4217 currency code)
 KWT – (s) Kuwait (ISO 3166 trigram)

KX 
 KX – (s) Cayman Airways (IATA airline designator)

KY 
 ky – (s) Kyrgyz language (ISO 639-1 code)
 KY
 (s) Cayman Islands (ISO 3166 digram)
 Kentucky (postal symbol)
 KYD – (s) Cayman Islands dollar (ISO 4217 currency code)

KZ 
 KZ – (s) Kazakhstan (FIPS 10-4 country code; ISO 3166 digram)
 KZN – (i) KwaZulu-Natal
 KZT – (s) Kazakh tenge (ISO 4217 currency code)

Acronyms K